Upton Cow Down is a 16.4 hectare biological Site of Special Scientific Interest in Wiltshire.  The down is an area of chalk grassland on the western edge of Salisbury Plain.  It lies one mile south of the town of Westbury, above the village of Upton Scudamore.

Sources

 English Nature citation sheet for the site (accessed 8 August 2006)

External links
 English Nature website (SSSI information)

Sites of Special Scientific Interest in Wiltshire